is a JR East railway station located in the city of Kazuno, Akita Prefecture, Japan.

Lines
Shibahira Station is served by the Hanawa Line, and is located 74.7 rail kilometers from the terminus of the line at Kōma Station.

Station layout
Shibahira Station consists of one side platform serving a single bi-directional track. The station is unattended.

History
Shibahira Station was opened on November 10, 1923 as a station on the privately owned Akita Railways, serving the village of Shibahira, Akita. The line was nationalized on June 1, 1934, becoming part of the Japanese Government Railways (JGR) system. The JGR became the Japan National Railways (JNR) after World War II. The station has been unattended since October 1, 1971. The station was absorbed into the JR East network upon the privatization of the JNR on April 1, 1987.

Surrounding area
Kazuno City Hall

See also
 List of Railway Stations in Japan

External links

  

Kazuno, Akita
Hanawa Line
Railway stations in Japan opened in 1923
Railway stations in Akita Prefecture
Stations of East Japan Railway Company